Arthur Foster may refer to:

Arthur Foster (footballer, born 1869) (1869–?), English footballer
Arthur Foster (footballer, born 1894) (1894–1954), English footballer and cricketer
Arthur B. Foster (1872–1958), Justice of the Supreme Court of Alabama